Jafarabad (also Romanized as Ja‘farābād; also known as Ja‘farābād-e Bālā, Ja‘farābād-e ‘Olya, and Ja’far Abad Olya) is a village in Solgi Rural District, Khezel District, Nahavand County, Hamadan Province, Iran. At the 2006 census, its population was 159, in 37 families.

References 

Populated places in Nahavand County